Alan Esplin Wood (1900–unknown) was an English footballer who played in the Football League for Coventry City and Crystal Palace.

References

1900 births
English footballers
Association football midfielders
English Football League players
Crystal Palace F.C. players
Coventry City F.C. players
Willenhall F.C. players
Year of death missing